Col. Lord James Cavendish (born 1701 – died  1741) was a British soldier, nobleman, and politician.

Cavendish was the third son of William Cavendish, 2nd Duke of Devonshire and Hon. Rachel Russell.

On 1 November 1738, he was appointed colonel of the 34th Regiment of Foot. He led the regiment during the War of Jenkins' Ear, and was present at several engagements, including the investment of Cartagena and the attempt upon Cuba. He was returned in May 1741 as the Member of Parliament for Malton, while in Jamaica between the two aforementioned engagements, but he died in November, presumably of tropical illness.

References
Leo van de Pas genealogies

1741 deaths
Members of the Parliament of Great Britain for English constituencies
34th Regiment of Foot officers
Younger sons of dukes
James
1701 births
British MPs 1741–1747